Mount Anne-Alice is a mountain summit in the Canadian Rockies of British Columbia, Canada.

Description

Mount Anne-Alice, elevation 2,941-meters (9,649-feet), is located on the Continental Divide just inside the Mount Robson Provincial Park boundary. It is situated on the northwest side of Berg Lake with precipitation runoff from the peak draining into the lake and Robson River. The nearest neighbor is Mumm Peak,  to the east. The mountain is composed of sedimentary rock laid down during the Precambrian to Jurassic periods and pushed east and over the top of younger rock during the Laramide orogeny.

History
The first ascent of the summit was made in 1939 by Anne MacLean Chesser and Alice Wright. They named the mountain after themselves since they found no evidence of a prior ascent. They built a stone cairn at the summit and claimed first ascent. Anne MacLean was a partner in the tourism and outfitting business at Mount Robson. Alice Wright was a frequent visitor at Berg Lake Chalet through the 1930s and 40s and was a well-known member of the tourism/outfitting industry throughout the Rockies. Alice was known to climbers as the "Mother Confessor of Mount Robson" because they would consult her before their ascents since she knew so much about the mountain. The mountain's toponym was officially adopted December 7, 1990, by the Geographical Names Board of Canada.

Climate

Based on the Köppen climate classification, Mount Anne-Alice is located in a subarctic climate zone with cold, snowy winters, and mild summers. Winter temperatures can drop below −20 °C with wind chill factors below −30 °C. This climate supports the Mural and Hargreaves glaciers on the peak's slopes.

See also
 List of peaks on the Alberta–British Columbia border
 
 Geography of British Columbia

References

External links
 Mount Anne-Alice: weather forecast
Mount Robson Provincial Park—BC Parks

Two-thousanders of British Columbia
Canadian Rockies
Cariboo Land District
Mount Robson Provincial Park